The 2020–21 Greek Football Cup was the 79th edition of the Greek Football Cup. It took place with the participation of the 14 clubs from the Super League 1, as there was no competitive action in the lower divisions (Super League 2, Football League and Gamma Ethniki) until early January due to the COVID-19 pandemic. The HFF decided that the Cup would be held with the participation of teams only from the top-flight Super League, which was normally in progress. The winner of the Cup qualified for the next season's Europa Conference League third qualifying round.

Calendar

Bracket

First round
The draw for this round took place on 5 January 2021.

Summary

||colspan="2" rowspan="2"

Matches

PAOK won 7–1 on aggregate.

Volos won 3–1 on aggregate.

PAS Giannina won 5–4 on aggregate.

Aris won 4–0 on aggregate.

AEK Athens won 3–2 on aggregate.

Olympiacos won 6–0 on aggregate.

Quarter-finals

The draw for this round took place on 5 February 2021. Shortly afterwards, Olympiacos vice-president Kostas Karapapas and Aris president Theodoros Karypidis both implied that the draw was fixed and claimed that some of the balls used from the HFF representative and chairman of the Greek Cup Committee Manos Gavrielidis during the procedure, were previously heated. Gavrielidis stated that there was a live streaming of the draw and everything was performed according to law on restrictions concerning the COVID-19 pandemic which forbade the presence of club representatives, something that was also applied in the previous draw. The Hellenic Football Federation issued a statement later that day denouncing the whole story as ridiculous and absurd. Olympiacos issued a statement in response, insisting that the draw was fixed by the Federation and accusing the HFF representatives of being corrupted and responsible for the total humiliation of the competition and of Greek football in general.

Summary

Matches

PAOK won 6–3 on aggregate.

Olympiacos won 3–2 on aggregate.

AEK Athens won 4–3 on aggregate.

The match was held at Panetolikos Stadium due to the inappropriateness of the Zosimades Stadium.

PAS Giannina won 4–2 on aggregate.

Semi-finals
The draw for this round took place on 16 March 2021.

Summary

Matches

Olympiacos won 4–2 on aggregate.

PAOK won 3–1 on aggregate.

Final

References

Cup
Greek Football Cup seasons
Greece
Greek Cup